His Majesty's Own Cossack Escort (Russian: Собственный Его Императорского Величества Конвой, E.И.B.) - was a Russian Imperial Guard formation, created for the Emperor of All Russia. At the Battle of Leipzig in the Napoleonic Wars, soldiers from the regiment saved then Emperor Alexander I of Russia from being captured by French forces under Napoleon Bonaparte.

The core of the regiment consisted entirely of 200 Terek Cossacks and 200 Kuban Cossacks, with 200 men of each cossack host in service, with the other 200 on military leave at any time.

History

Originally formed in 1811 during the Napoleonic Wars, the regiment served until shortly after the February Revolution and the overthrow of Nicholas II, at which time it was dissolved.

The Barracks of His Own Majesty's Cossack Escort was in Pushkin, St. Petersburg near the imperial residence of Tsarskoye Selo.

Commanders
 26.08.1856—30.08.1858 — Flügeladjutant, prince Pyotr Romanovich Bagration
 27.09.1858—08.03.1864 — Polkovnik (from 1860 — Major-General) Dmitri Ivanovich Skobelev
 08.03.1864—24.05.1869 — Flügeladjutant, Polkovnik Sergei Alekseev Sheremetev
 24.05.1869—13.08.1878 — Flügeladjutant, Polkovnik (from 17.10.1877 — Major-General of the Svita) Peter Alexandrovich Cherevin
 13.08.1878—30.08.1887 — Flügeladjutant, Polkovnik Modest Alexandrovich Ivashkin-Potanoff
 30.08.1887—17.02.1893 — Polkovnik (from 30.08.1891 — General-Major of the Svita) Vladimir Alekseevich Sheremetev
 06.05.1893—12.06.1906 — Flügeladjutant, Polkovnik (from 1896 — Major-General of the Svita) baron Alexander Yegorovich Meiendorf
 12.06.1906—01.01.1914 — Polkovnkik (from 31.05.1907 — Major-General of the Svita) prince Georgi Ivanovich Trubetskoy
 02.01.1914—22.03.1917 — Major-General of the Svita, count Alexander Nikolaevich Grabbe
 15.03.1917—30.03.1917 — Polkovnik Georgi Antonovich Rashpil

See also
 Russian Imperial Guard
 Imperial guard

References
 

Russian Imperial Guard
Guards regiments of the Russian Empire